Norbert Verougstraete (born 16 December 1934 – 17 February 2016) was a Belgian cyclist. He competed in the individual and team road race events at the 1956 Summer Olympics.

References

External links
 

1934 births
2016 deaths
Belgian male cyclists
Olympic cyclists of Belgium
Cyclists at the 1956 Summer Olympics
Sportspeople from Kortrijk
Cyclists from West Flanders